Aïn Oussera or Aïn Oussara is a city in Djelfa Province, Algeria, with an estimated (2005) population of 134,174. It is the district seat of the Aïn Oussera District. This city, located 200 km south of the capital Algiers, is crossed by the Trans-Saharan Highway main road number 1. The road that runs through the whole of Algeria from north to south over 2000 km, connects Algiers on its southern border with Mali near Tamanrasset.  
Ain Oussera, has experienced, since 1990, rapid population growth due to its proximity to the 15 MW Es Salam nuclear reactor. Aïn Oussera is on the crossroads of the N1 (Trans-Saharan) and N40B highways. The nearest airport is the Algerian Air Force's Aïn Oussera airfield (DAAQ).

Climate 
Aïn Oussera has a cold semi-arid climate (Köppen climate classification BSk), while it closely borders cold desert climate (BWk).

References

Populated places in Djelfa Province
Cities in Algeria